Memorial Park is a 72-acre park located in Athens, Georgia. The park is home to the Bear Hollow Zoo and the Birchmore Trail. The park also features the Athens Creative Theater, a playground, dog park, outdoor basketball courts, swimming pool, picnic areas, and a fishing pond.

Bear Hollow Zoo 

The Bear Hollow Zoo located in Memorial Park is a zoo with animals that are non-releasable to the wild. The zoo's most famous residents are the American black bears DJ, Athena, and Yonah. Bear Hollow also includes white-tailed deer, an American alligator, North American river otters, great horned owls, and a reptile house.

Birchmore Trail 
The Birchmore Trail is a 1.25 mile trail named for Fred Birchmore because of the 18 foot tall wall Fred built whilst he was in his 70's. The wall is dubbed "The Great Wall of Happy Hollow".

Athens Creative Theater 
The Athens Creative Theater is a performing arts center that opened in 1966. It is non-profit and a division of the Athens-Clarke County Leisure Services.

Other features 

The park also includes a fishing pond, playground, dog park, and more. The pond also includes ducks, geese, and many different types of turtles.

References 

Parks in Georgia (U.S. state)
Tourist attractions in Athens, Georgia